Ælfgifu of Exeter was an Anglo-Saxon saint, of unknown date or origin, whose relics were held by Exeter Cathedral. She is mentioned in the Old English Exeter relic-list as "the holy servant of Christ ... who would daily perform her confession before she went into church". It is possible that she is the 10th-century royal abbess, Ælfgifu of Shaftesbury wife of Edmund I (as one 12th-century writer believed), but it is "more likely" according to historian John Blair that she was not.

See also
 List of Anglo-Saxon saints

Notes

References

 

Christian saints in unknown century
People from Exeter
West Saxon saints
Medieval English saints
Year of birth unknown
Christianity in Devon